Bladbean is a scattered hamlet between Canterbury and Folkestone in Kent, England. It lies along a minor road east of Stelling Minnis. It is in the civil parish of Elham.

Hamlets in Kent
Folkestone and Hythe District